The Kansas City Championship was a golf tournament on the Symetra Tour. From 2007 to 2010, it was played at Leawood South Country Club in Leawood, Kansas. It returned in 2016 and was played at the Staley Farms Golf Club in Kansas City, Missouri.

The tournament was a 54-hole event, as are most Symetra Tour tournaments.

Winners

^ Rain-shortened to 18 holes.
† Rain-shortened to 36 holes.
* Championship won in sudden-death playoff.

Tournament records

External links
Coverage on Symetra Tour's official site

Former Symetra Tour events
Golf in Kansas
Golf in Missouri
Sports in the Kansas City metropolitan area
2007 establishments in Kansas
Recurring sporting events established in 2007